Phyllonorycter sandraella is a moth of the family Gracillariidae. It is known from California, United States.

The larvae feed on Quercus agrifolia and Quercus wislizeni. They mine the leaves of their host plant.

References

External links
mothphotographersgroup

sandraella
Moths of North America
Moths described in 1971